Lebensohl is a contract bridge convention whose variants can be used in the following situations:
 by responder after an opponent's overcall of a one notrump (1NT) opening bid in order to compete further in the auction without necessarily committing the partnership to game.
 after opponents' weak-two bids and
 in responding to a reverse by partner.

Origins and spelling
The origins of the convention are unknown and various views about its spelling have ensued.

The Official Encyclopedia of Bridge (OEB) first listed LEBENSOHL in its third edition published in 1976 and attributed its design to George Boehm; the fourth OEB edition, under the entry LEBENSOLD, states that George Boehm first described the convention and that Boehm had wrongly attributed it to Ken Lebensold; the fifth and sixth editions state likewise but under LEBENSOHL. In the seventh edition and for the first time, the OEB notes "Uniquely amongst bridge conventions, it should arguably be spelled with a lowercase first letter – lebensohl."

In another account, Lebensohl is said to have been observed in use in the late 1960s and... 

The November 1970 Bridge World article by Boehm was the first published on Lebensohl but he does not attribute the convention to Ken Lebensold in it. However, Boehm does recount that in preparation for a competition in New York in late 1969, his convention card had the entry "Lebensohl when you overcall our notrump opening". Ken Lebensold was also a competitor at the event and upon reviewing Boehm's convention card, "disowned the convention". Boehm goes on to state that therefore he and his playing partner (son, Augie) "have decided to designate it "lebensohl" and to continue to use it without fee or license". Notwithstanding Boehm naming and spelling it uncapitalized, most bridge literature refers to the convention as Lebensohl with occasional post-1970 use of Lebensold going uncorrected.

After an overcall of a 1NT opening
Lebensohl can be initiated by responder after partner has opened 1NT and right hand opponent (RHO) has overcalled with a suit bid at the two level:

†These explanations assume the partnership has agreed that “slow shows”, i.e., that the slower sequences, which start with 2NT, show a stopper in overcaller’s suit, while the more direct sequences deny a stopper. Conversely, this is sometimes described as FADS - fast arrival denies stopper. It is also possible to agree the reverse—that “slow denies”, in which case the sequences which start with 2NT deny a stopper and the more direct sequences show one. This may also be called FASS - fast arrival shows stopper.

Double of the overcall

A Double by responder is not part of Lebensohl. However it forms part of the entire set of bids available to responder and its meaning is the subject of a partnership agreement. Usually its meaning is, in turn, dependent upon the meaning of the overcall and the meaning of the overcall can vary widely because there are a number of conventional systems available to an overcaller after a 1NT opening.

Generally, a Double is for penalty. When the overcall is in a suit held by the responder, the double shows a decent non-game forcing hand with a four-card or very good three-card holding in the suit specified. It is for penalty (not game forcing) but opener may choose to bid 3NT based on information now or later available. When the overcall is in a suit, which by partnership agreement specifies another suit or suits, the Double is for takeout indicating that responder holds a minimum of something like AKxxx, AQJxx or KQJxx in the doubled suit.

Other applications

After a Weak-two
After a Weak-two opening and a takeout double, Lebensohl is used to enable a better indication of the strength of the responder to the doubler.

For example, after (2) – Dbl – (P):
With 0-7 points 2NT is bid forcing a relay of 3. This is either passed or corrected to another suit.
With 8-11 points suits are bid at the 3 level.
With values for game it is bid.

If there is space to bid a suit at the 2 level; e.g. after (2) – Dbl – (P) and the suit held is spades:
With 0-7 points bid 2
With 8-11 points 2NT is bid forcing a relay of 3. Then 3 is bid showing the invite.
3 is now game forcing.

With a very strong hand the doubler can by-pass 3.

After a major is raised to the two level
The same scheme can be played after the sequence:
(1M) – P – (2M) – Dbl; (P) – ? or (1M) – Dbl – (2M) – ?

After a non-game-forcing reverse
After the sequence 1 – (P) – 1 – (P); 2 – (P) – ?:
2 shows a weak hand with spades
2NT shows a minimum hand and forces 3. Preference is usually then given for openers suits.
Any other bid is now game forcing.

This has the effect of saving space when responder wants to force game and show support.

See also
Rubensohl.
Blackout convention

References

Further reading
  23 page pamphlet. ASIN: B0006YE9V6
  16 page pamphlet.

External links
Lebensohl described at BridgeGuys.com

Bridge conventions